"Jos mä oisin sä" is a song by Finnish rapper Cheek. Released on 15 April 2009, the song serves as the first single from Cheek's fifth studio album Jare Henrik Tiihonen. "Jos mä oisin sä" peaked at number one on the Finnish Singles Chart.

Chart performance

References

2009 singles
Cheek (rapper) songs
Number-one singles in Finland
2009 songs